The 1987 Texas Longhorns baseball team represented the University of Texas at Austin in the 1987 NCAA Division I baseball season. The Longhorns played their home games at Disch–Falk Field. The team was coached by Cliff Gustafson in his 20th season at Texas.

The Longhorns reached the College World Series, finishing third with wins over Arkansas, Florida State and eventual runner-up Oklahoma State and a pair of losses to eventual champion Stanford.

Personnel

Roster

Schedule and results

Notelist

References

Texas Longhorns baseball seasons
Texas Longhorns
Southwest Conference baseball champion seasons
College World Series seasons
Texas Longhorns
Southwest Conference Baseball Tournament champion seasons